Brisbane Grove is a locality in the Goulburn Mulwaree Council area, New South Wales, Australia. It is located on the road from Goulburn to Braidwood about 8 km south of Goulburn. Goulburn Airport is in the locality, on its southwestern edge. The Hume Highway passes through the northernmost part of Brisbane Grove, but there is no exit or entrance.

References

Localities in New South Wales
Southern Tablelands
Goulburn Mulwaree Council